Chester is a town in Hampden County, Massachusetts, United States, situated in Western Massachusetts. It is part of the Springfield metropolitan statistical area. The town includes the Chester Factory Village Historic District. The total population was 1,228 in the 2020 census.

History

The area was opened for settlement in the 1750s as Township No. 9. It was incorporated as Murrayfield by the Massachusetts General Court on October 31, 1765. The town’s name was often confused with that of nearby Myrifield, also spelled “Merryfield” (now Rowe, Massachusetts) so the town petitioned the General Court to change its name to “Fairfield”. The General Court chose the name “Chester” instead and passed the act to change its name on February 21, 1783. 

The Western Railroad (later Boston & Albany Railroad) opened to Chester on May 24, 1841. In 1893 the collapse of a railroad bridge in Chester killed 14 people.

Geography
Set on the eastern edge of the Berkshires, Chester makes up the northwest corner of Hampden County. It is bordered by Huntington on the east, Worthington and Middlefield on the north, Becket on the west, and Blandford on the south.

It is drained by tributaries of the Westfield River. Many brooks flow into the Westfield throughout Chester. The West Branch of the Westfield flows through the western and southern parts of town and passes through the village of Chester, while the Middle Branch flows through the northern and eastern parts of the town, passing through the villages of North Chester and Dayville. The small village of Chester Center occupies high ground between the two river branches. U.S. Route 20 follows the West Branch from the southeast corner of the town to Chester village, then turns west up the valley of Walker Brook on its way to the town of Becket.

Temperature records
This remains the hottest temperature ever recorded in the state of Massachusetts, along with a similar reading in New Bedford on the same day. Thus, Chester is only one of three places in the United States which has recorded both of its state's extreme temperatures, the others being Millsboro, Delaware, and Warsaw, Missouri.

Demographics

As of the census of 2000, there were 1,308 people, 500 households, and 360 families residing in the town. There were 580 housing units at an average density of 15.8 per square mile (6.1/km2). The racial makeup of the town was 98.24% White, 0.15% African American, 0.46% Native American, 0.08% Asian, 0.31% from other races, and 0.76% from two or more races. Hispanic or Latino of any race were 1.30% of the population.

There were 500 households, out of which 35.0% had children under the age of 18 living with them, 60.0% were married couples living together, 7.6% had a female householder with no husband present, and 27.8% were non-families. 21.2% of all households were made up of individuals, and 8.6% had someone living alone who was 65 years of age or older.  The average household size was 2.62 and the average family size was 3.06.

In the town, the population was spread out, with 25.0% under the age of 18, 7.3% from 18 to 24, 30.2% from 25 to 44, 26.1% from 45 to 64, and 11.5% who were 65 years of age or older.  The median age was 39 years. For every 100 females, there were 106.0 males.  For every 100 females age 18 and over, there were 102.3 males.

The median income for a household in the town was $43,816, and the median income for a family was $51,932. Males had a median income of $38,083 versus $25,789 for females. The per capita income for the town was $18,098.  About 2.9% of families and 5.8% of the population were below the poverty line, including 3.0% of those under age 18 and 7.8% of those age 65 or over.

Library
The Chester public library was established in 1894. In fiscal year 2008, the town of Chester spent 1.04% ($28,512) of its budget on its public library—some $22 per person.

Theater 
Chester is home to Chester Theatre Company, a professional summer theater founded in 1990.

Notable people
 Rowland Day, congressman
 Capt. David Shepard, American doctor and soldier; an early proponent of inoculation to prevent smallpox

See also
Gateway Regional School District (Massachusetts)

References

 Chester Folks: The Founders of the Town, Their Ancestors and Descendants. Compiled by William S. Mills, 1923; Edited by Charles B. Moore, 1996. Available from the Chester Historical Society
 Chester, MA by Narrative compiled by the Massachusetts Department of Housing and Community Development (DHCD), at MassOnline

External links

 Town of Chester official website
 Chester Historical Society
 MHC Survey Reconnaissance Town Report: Chester, Massachusetts Historical Commission, 1982

 
Towns in Hampden County, Massachusetts
Springfield metropolitan area, Massachusetts
Towns in Massachusetts